Reedham railway station is on the Wherry Lines in the East of England, serving the village of Reedham, Norfolk. It is commonly suffixed as Reedham (Norfolk) in order to distinguish it from the station of the same name in south London. Its three-letter station code is REE.

The station is currently managed by Greater Anglia, which also operates all trains serving the station. The majority of services run between Norwich and Lowestoft, but three trains per day run to and from Great Yarmouth via the remote Berney Arms station. Services are operated by the brand new Stadler FLIRT Class 755 bi-mode multiple units, which entered service on the Wherry Lines in autumn 2019.

History

The Bill for the Yarmouth & Norwich Railway (Y&NR) received Royal Assent on 18 June 1842. Work started on the line in April 1843 and the line and its stations were opened on 1 May 1844. Reedham station opened with the line and was, as it is now, situated east of Cantley station and west of Berney Arms station. The Y&NR was the first public railway line in Norfolk.
On 30 June 1845 a Bill authorising the amalgamation of the Y&NR with the Norwich & Brandon Railway came into effect and Reedham station became a Norfolk Railway asset.

In 1845 an Act incorporated the Lowestoft Railway & Harbour Company (LR&HC). In 1846 the LR&HC was leased to the Norfolk Railway (NR) and work started on building a line from Lowestoft, in Suffolk to join the Yarmouth & Norwich line South-East of Reedham. On 1 July 1847 the NR opens the Lowestoft to Reedham line. The station south-east of Reedham on the line to Lowestoft was Haddiscoe.

A couple of months after the Lowestoft line opened, the next station west, was closed by the Norfolk Railway.

The Eastern Counties Railway (ECR) and its rival the Eastern Union Railway (EUR) were both sizing up the NR to acquire and expand their railway empire. The ECR trumped the EUR by taking over the NR, including Reedham Station on 8 May 1848.

The ECR reopened Cantley in 1851, once again making it the next station west.

By the 1860s the railways in East Anglia were in financial trouble, and most were leased to the Eastern Counties Railway, which wished to amalgamate formally but could not obtain government agreement for this until an Act of Parliament on 7 August 1862, when the Great Eastern Railway (GER) was formed by the amalgamation. Actually, Reedham became a GER station on 1 July 1862 when the GER took over the ECR and the EUR before the Bill received the Royal Assent.

By the first decade of the last Century the GER started building new stations at Reedham and at Haddiscoe. On 9 May 1904 Haddiscoe Station was closed and replaced by Haddiscoe Low Level on a new site. On 1 June 1904 the GER opened today's Reedham Station and closed the Y&NR station which was 300 metres East of the new station.

The system settled down for the next 17 years, apart from the disruption of the First World War. The difficult economic circumstances that existed after the war led the Government to pass the Railways Act 1921, which led to the creation of the Big Four. The GER amalgamated with several other companies to form the London and North Eastern Railway (LNER). Reedham became a LNER station on 1 January 1923.

In 1928 the LNER renamed Reedham as Reedham (Norfolk) to distinguish it from the Southern Railway) station of Reedham-Surrey.

At nationalisation in 1948, the station and its services were transferred to the Eastern Region of British Railways.

Following the privatisation of British Rail, Railtrack became responsible for infrastructure maintenance in 1994. Following Railtrack's financial problems Network Rail took over operation of the infrastructure in 2002.

The station and its operations came under the Anglia Railways franchise in 1997. Subsequently, National Express East Anglia, then known as One, took over management in 2004.

The station, along with its services, were transferred to Abellio Greater Anglia in 2012.

In October 2018, Network Rail remodelled the Reedham Junction layout and begun the resignalling process, temporarily closing the Berney Arms line to Great Yarmouth. It reopened on 24 February 2020.

Services
Trains are operated by Greater Anglia.

On Saturdays between February and May there is an additional train in both directions between Norwich and Great Yarmouth via Reedham, calling at Brundall and Reedham only. The down service (towards Yarmouth) departs Norwich at 05:32. The up service (towards Norwich) departs Great Yarmouth at 23:34.

References

External links 

Railway stations in Norfolk
DfT Category F1 stations
Former Great Eastern Railway stations
Greater Anglia franchise railway stations
Railway stations in Great Britain opened in 1844